Francesco Salerno (9 September 1925 – 17 October 1998) was an Italian politician.

Lawyer, publicist and member of the Christian Democracy political party, he was appointed Deputy Minister to the Prime Minister office in 1979, during the presidency of  Francesco Cossiga.

In addition to achieving high positions in Italian politics, he was for 22 years president of the Matera football club.

Orders of Merit
  2nd Class / Grand Officer: Grande Ufficiale Ordine al Merito della Repubblica Italiana

Christian Democracy (Italy) politicians
20th-century Italian politicians
People from Matera
1925 births
1998 deaths